This is an incomplete list of 123 North Korean merchant ships with a gross tonnage of approximately 420,000 gt.

In February 2015, press reports indicated that Ocean Maritime Management Company, which controls North Korean merchant shipping, has renamed at least some of these ships to avoid international sanctions. Several front companies in Hong Kong also act as owners for DPRK-flagged ships. These include "Trendy Sunshine Hong Kong Limited," "SBC International," "Advance Superstar (Hong Kong) Limited" and "Shen Zhong International Shipping."

List

Re-flagging
Nearly 50 North Korean flagged ships have been re-flagged to the flag of Tanzania since March 2016, because of the new UN sanctions.

See also 
List of active North Korean ships
North Korea Maritime Administration
Rajin University of Marine Transport

References

External links 
North Korea’s Maritime Administration website

Korea, North
Ships of North Korea
Merchant ships of North Korea